10 Exitos de Juan Gabriel (English: 10 Hits of Juan Gabriel)  is the fifth studio album by Juan Gabriel, originally released on January 1, 1975 and re-released on April 15, 1991.

Track listing

References

External links 
official website
 10 Exitos de Juan Gabriel on mtv.com
 10 Exitos de Juan Gabriel on mtv.com
[] 10 Exitos de Juan Gabriel on allmusic.com

Juan Gabriel albums
1975 albums